Fred Paul Hedges (March 27, 1921—June 19, 1999) was a master guitar builder and guitar teacher from Ewing, Illinois and based in Mount Juliet, Tennessee. He started playing guitar when he was 12 years old. He was a musician as a hobby and was a cabinetmaker and die maker by trade. He lived in Ann Arbor, Michigan, where he was a machinist and union labor leader, before moving to Nashville, Tennessee.

Freddie Paul Hedges was a long-time friend of Grand Ole Opry star Billy Grammer who hired Hedges to help establish Grammer and J.W. Gower's newly formed guitar company. In the 1960s, Hedges helped make finishing touches to the guitars and set up machines to mass-produce acoustic guitars for Grammer & Gower Guitar Co. in Nashville. In 1974, Hedges and his two sons opened Shiloh Music Center in Mount Juliet. Fred Hedges is credited for hundreds of people learning to play the guitar and other stringed instruments in Nashville, Tennessee. However, due to poor health, Hedges stepped back not long after opening and his sons took over.

He has two sons, George and Richard, and three daughters, Gail Harrison, Pauline Williams, and April Hedges. Hedges died on June 19, 1999 in Durham, North Carolina.

References 

1921 births
1999 deaths
Guitar makers
People from Mount Juliet, Tennessee
People from Franklin County, Illinois
American luthiers